James Whiteaker (born 8 October 1998) is an English athlete specialising in the Javelin throw.

He became British champion when winning the javelin throw event at the 2018 British Athletics Championships. He then became a two times British champion when winning the title again at the 2020 British Athletics Championships with a throw of 75.99 metres.

References

Living people
1998 births
English male javelin throwers
British male javelin throwers
British Athletics Championships winners